Hajji Din Mohammad also known as Azizullah Din Mohammad is a politician in Afghanistan who served as the Governor of Nangarhar Province followed by Governor of Kabul Province. He is currently the Chairman of Peace and Development Islamic Party. He has been involved in the peace and reconciliation process between the Afghan Government and the Taliban and is currently the  deputy of High Council for National Reconciliation. Haji Din Mohammad comes from a distinguished Pashtun family "Arsala" The Arsala family is part of the Jabar Khel (a subtribe of the land-owning Ahmadzai tribe). He is also the elder brother of late Hajji Abdul Qadir and Abdul Haq His great-grandfather, Wazir Arsala Khan, served as Foreign Minister of Afghanistan in 1869. One of Arsala Khan's descendants, Taj Mohammad Khan, was a general at the Battle of Maiwand. Another descendant, Abdul Jabbar Khan, was Afghanistan’s first Ambassador to Russia.

Early life and family background
Din Mohammad was born in Nangarhar, Afghanistan. His father, Amanullah khan, served as a district administer in various parts of the country. Two of his uncles, Mohammad Rafiq Khan and Haji Zaman Khan, were members of the 7th session of the Afghan Parliament which worked to expand the rights of ordinary citizens under the monarchy.

Din Mohammad's brothers Abdul Haq and Hajji Abdul Qadir were Mujahideen commanders who fought against the Communist Red Army during the 1980s Soviet–Afghan War. Din Mohammad served as the deputy of the Hezbi Islami Party of Mohammad Yunus Khalis. Not Hizb Islami of Gulbuddin Hekmatyar.

He served as the Minister of National Security in Afghanistan's Interim Government in Exile during the 1990s and as Minister of Education in the Mujahideen Government which was established after the collapse of the Communist government. He also served as Deputy Prime Minister in the same period, but resigned when infighting erupted among the rival factions of Ahmad Shah Massoud and Gulbuddin Hekmatyar.

Governor
During the Taliban era, Din Mohammad lived in exile and later helped Abdul Haq in his efforts to establish a broad-based post-Taliban government. In 2001, Abdul Haq was captured and executed by the Taliban while pursuing efforts to promote the formation of a broad-based representative government. Din Mohammad's son Ezatullah Sahil was captured and killed by the Taliban along with Abdul Haq in 2001. Abdul Qadir served as the Governor of Nangarhar Province after the Soviet Occupation and was credited with maintaining peace in the province during the years of civil conflict that followed the Soviet withdrawal. Abdul Qadir served as a Vice President in the newly formed post-Taliban government of Hamid Karzai, but was assassinated by unknown assailants in July 2002. In the same month of 2002, Din Mohammad was selected as the Governor of Nangarhar Province. in August 2005, he became the Governor of Kabul Province until August 2009.

Din Mohammad and his brother Hajji Nasrullah Baryalai Arsalai remain committed to the principles of inclusive government and reconciliation among competing factions in Afghanistan, and have been active in promoting the economic development and reconstruction of Afghan society after decades of chaos and violence.

References

External links
 Hajji Din Mohammad Biography
 Afghanistan through the eyes of a governor

Living people
Education ministers of Afghanistan
Interior ministers of Afghanistan
Pashtun people
Arsala family
Mohammad|Haji Din
Governors of Kabul Province
Governors of Nangarhar Province
1953 births